Santosh Pandey (born 31 December 1967) is an Indian politician From Bharatiya Janata Party And serves as the Member of Parliament, Lok Sabha from Rajnandgaon, Chhattisgarh.

References

1967 births
Living people
India MPs 2019–present
Bharatiya Janata Party politicians from Chhattisgarh
Lok Sabha members from Chhattisgarh

People from Rajnandgaon